The 2019 All Japan High School Soccer Tournament (All Japan JFA 98th High School Soccer Tournament (Japanese: 第98回全国高等学校サッカー選手権大会)) marked the 98th edition of the referred annually contested cup for High Schools over Japan. As usual, the tournament was contested by 48 High Schools, with 1 High School per Prefecture being qualified for the tournament, with an exception made for the Tokyo, which had 2 High Schools representing their Prefecture. The final was played at the Saitama Stadium 2002.

The Shizuoka Gakuen High School won the tournament over Aomori Yamada by 3–2.

Calendar
The tournament took place in a 15-day span, with the tournament split in a total of 6 stages.

Venues
The tournament was played in four prefectures and nine stadiums, with six (two for each prefecture) located in Chiba, Kanagawa, and Tokyo Prefectures, and three located in Saitama. They are:

Tokyo – Ajinomoto Field Nishigaoka, and Komazawa Olympic Park Stadium
Saitama – Saitama Stadium 2002, Urawa Komaba Stadium and NACK5 Stadium Omiya
Kanagawa – NHK Spring Mitsuzawa Football Stadium and Kawasaki Todoroki Stadium
Chiba – Fukuda Denshi Arena and ZA Oripri Stadium

Participating clubs
In parentheses: the amount of times each team qualified for the All Japan High School Tournament (appearance in the 2020 edition included)

Schedule
The schedule and the match pairings were confirmed on 18 November 2019.

First round

Second round

Round of 16

Quarter-finals

Semi-finals

Final

References

External links
Official Schedule (JFA)
About the Tournament (JFA)

Football competitions in Japan
Youth football competitions
2019 in Japanese football